Allen Cedric "A.C." Cowlings (born June 16, 1947) is a former American football player and actor. He began playing for the National Football League (NFL) in 1970, for such teams as the Buffalo Bills, Houston Oilers, Los Angeles Rams, Seattle Seahawks, and the San Francisco 49ers, until retiring after the 1979 season. Cowlings was taken fifth overall in the first round by the Buffalo Bills in the 1970 NFL Draft. 

Cowlings is most famous for his role in aiding his close friend O. J. Simpson in fleeing the police on June 17, 1994, after Simpson was accused of killing his ex-wife Nicole Brown Simpson and her friend Ronald Goldman. After leading police on a low-speed chase, Cowlings drove Simpson back to his home, where he was arrested. Cowlings was also arrested for aiding Simpson, but charges were dropped for lack of evidence.

Early life
Cowlings was born on June 16, 1947, in San Francisco, and raised in its Potrero Hill neighborhood. There he was a member of the Superiors social club, which met at the Booker T. Washington Community Center. He attended Galileo High School, where he played football with O. J. Simpson. He and Simpson became friends. After high school, both attended City College of San Francisco, where they played on the football team.

Football career

Cowlings was named an All-American defensive tackle after his senior year at the University of Southern California (USC). During his senior year, the Trojans went undefeated, and Cowlings led a powerful defensive line, nicknamed "The Wild Bunch" after the movie of the same name.

Cowlings was drafted fifth in the first round of the 1970 NFL Draft by the Buffalo Bills. He was a starter his first three years in Buffalo, but was traded to Houston Oilers after the 1972 season. He played all 14 games for the Oilers in both 1973 and 1974, but just five games in 1975 for the Rams. In 1976, he became a charter member of the Seattle Seahawks, after being signed off the waiver wire when the Rams released him at the end of the preseason. He played just one game, due to an injury he suffered while playing for the Rams in an exhibition game against the Seahawks. He returned to the Rams in 1977, played with CFL Montreal Alouettes in 1978, and finished his career in 1979 with the San Francisco 49ers.

Acting career
Cowlings's first film role was in the 1985 film Bubba Until It Hurts, starring Bubba Smith. He had a recurring minor role as Coach Nabors in the HBO football sitcom 1st & Ten, which also starred Simpson. Cowlings also served as a technical football advisor on the football scenes in the 1991 Tony Scott film The Last Boy Scout.

Friendship with O. J. Simpson
Cowlings was a close friend of O. J. Simpson, whom he has known since childhood. They were teammates at Galileo High School, San Francisco City College, USC, on the Buffalo Bills, and on the San Francisco 49ers. Cowlings dated Simpson's first wife, Marguerite Whitley, while they were attending Galileo High School, and when they were having issues as a couple, Simpson stepped in as a mediator, but the discussion turned into a relationship and they married in 1967; Cowlings was reportedly angry at the time, but their friendship prevailed. They remained close friends and confidants through the years, with Cowlings being the godfather of Simpson's son Jason and a groomsman at Simpson's and Nicole Brown's wedding in 1985. Cowlings was also the ring bearer at mutual friends Robert and Kris Kardashian's wedding in 1978. 
 
After the murders of Nicole Brown and her friend Ronald Goldman on June 12, 1994, in which Simpson was a "person of interest", Brown's funeral took place in the St. Martin of Tours Catholic Church in Brentwood on June 16, Cowlings's 47th birthday; Cowlings served as a gatekeeper and pallbearer at the funeral. During the memorial service at David LeBon's house, Cowlings paid his respects to Brown while holding back tears.

The next day, despite agreeing to turn himself into the Los Angeles Police Department (LAPD), Simpson failed to surrender at the Parker Center station. Later that day, witnesses reported seeing Simpson riding in a white Ford Bronco, a vehicle owned and being driven by Cowlings, thus becoming the object of a low-speed chase by California Highway Patrol cruisers on the freeways. During the chase, Cowlings made a 911 call from a cell phone and claimed that Simpson was armed with a gun pointed to his own head, demanding that Cowlings drive him to Simpson's estate in Brentwood, or Simpson would kill himself. The pursuit was televised on live TV from helicopter. It interrupted coverage of the 1994 NBA Finals, and was viewed by approximately 95 million people in the United States alone. During the chase, an agitated Cowlings famously told 911 dispatchers: "My name is A.C.! You know who I am, goddamn it!" The chase ended at Simpson's Brentwood home, where Simpson surrendered to police after a nearly hourlong wait.

When the chase concluded and Cowlings and Simpson surrendered, Cowlings was arrested and charged with a felony for aiding a fugitive. He was taken to the Los Angeles men's jail and released approximately 12 hours after his arrest on $250,000 bail. District Attorney Gil Garcetti eventually determined that Cowlings would not be charged due to lack of sufficient evidence. In Outrage: The Five Reasons Why O. J. Simpson Got Away with Murder, Vincent Bugliosi wrote that Detective Philip Vannatter had asked Cowlings if he believed Simpson had committed the murders; Cowlings conceded that the police had a lot of physical evidence and that it would speak for itself.

During Simpson's criminal trial, Cowlings surprised the media with a press conference held a block from the courthouse. Cowlings retained Beverly Hills public relations firm Edward Lozzi & Associates to conduct the press conference without revealing the reason or itinerary. Lozzi introduced Cowlings and Cowlings's attorney, Donald Re. Cowlings then announced he had created a 900 phone number for the public to ask him questions—about anything except the murder and trial. Cowlings read a one-minute prepared statement announcing the 900 number, which was simultaneously unveiled visually in the room. Reports that Cowlings realized over $1 million from this $2-dollars-plus-a-minute 900 number were never verified. Under oath in his deposition for Simpson's civil trial, Cowlings said that the 900 number endeavor just "broke even." This press conference was the only time Cowlings officially spoke to the media about anything related to the Simpson case. Former porn star and ex-girlfriend Jennifer Peace, who testified before a grand jury, claimed that Cowlings had confessed to her that a hysterical Simpson had called him on the night of the murders and that the murder weapon had been disposed of; Cowlings denied the allegations.

After Simpson's acquittal in October 1995, Fred Goldman, Ron's father, filed a civil suit against Simpson for wrongful death. Cowlings was subpoenaed and during both the deposition and trial took the Fifth Amendment when asked what he was doing between June 13, 1994, when Simpson returned from Chicago, and the freeway chase on June 17, 1994, as he could still be charged for aiding and abetting. But he testified that he had seen Simpson throw out Brown's clothes from their apartment during an argument in 1979 and that while he was driving Brown to a hospital on New Year's Eve 1989, she told him Simpson hit her, which (along with Brown's recorded 911 calls, pictures of her with bruises, and similar witness testimony about physical aggression by Simpson against Brown) contradicted Simpson's civil trial testimony that he had never been abusive during their marriage. In contrast to Simpson's indifferent and cheerful demeanor throughout the trial, Cowlings notably broke down in tears after being shown photographs of Nicole's bruised face. Simpson was found liable for both deaths in February 1997.

Bronco
In 1994, Cowlings's 1993 Ford Bronco from the low-speed chase was purchased by Simpson's former sports agent Mike Gilbert and two other men, then ended up sitting in a parking garage for the next 17 years (1995-2012), where it was rarely used. As of 2017, the vehicle was on loan to the Alcatraz East Crime Museum, where it was put on display as part of an exhibit on the murder trial.

Personal life

Cowlings is a member of the 2009 USC Athletic Hall of Fame class along with Junior Seau, Rodney Peete, and John Robinson. USC's Cowlings Residential College is named in his honor.

In 2012, Fox News examined the lives of key individuals in the Simpson case and found that Cowlings was reportedly working as a handbag sales representative. In 2014, an ex-teammate told USA Today that Cowlings worked for B. Wayne Hughes, founder of Public Storage. Six months later, USA Today quoted retired tennis player and friend of Cowlings Joe Kolkowitz saying that Cowlings had retired and is still living in Southern California. 

In 2016, Cowlings was played by Malcolm-Jamal Warner in the critically acclaimed series The People v. O. J. Simpson: American Crime Story. According to TMZ, during production, Cowlings had reportedly threatened to sue FX if he was portrayed negatively.

In March 2018, O.J. Simpson (after his parole for armed robbery and kidnapping) said that he may have chronic traumatic encephalopathy (CTE), a neurodegenerative disease common in athletes who have suffered numerous head wounds or concussions. Simpson said that close friends and former teammates, including Cowlings, also struggle with the symptoms of CTE.

Notes

References

External links
, IMDb

1947 births
Living people
African-American players of American football
African-American players of Canadian football
American football defensive ends
American football defensive tackles
American football linebackers
Buffalo Bills players
Canadian football defensive linemen
Canadian football linebackers
City College of San Francisco Rams football players
Houston Oilers players
Los Angeles Rams players
Montreal Alouettes players
O. J. Simpson murder case
Players of American football from San Francisco
San Francisco 49ers players
Seattle Seahawks players
USC Trojans football players